Méndez is a common Spanish surname, originally a patronymic, meaning Son of Mendo, Menendo, or Mem. A longer form sharing the same root is Menéndez, while the Portuguese form is Mendes. Méndez may refer to:

General

Ana G. Méndez (1908–1997), Puerto Rican educator
Ángel Rivero Méndez (1856–1930), Puerto Rican soldier, writer, journalist and businessman
Arnaldo Tamayo Méndez (born 1942), Cuban cosmonaut
Jonna Mendez, (born 1945), American CIA official
Juan E. Méndez (born 1944), Argentine lawyer and academic
Miguel A. García Méndez (1902–1998), Puerto Rican businessman, lawyer, statesman and banker
Tony Mendez, American CIA officer
Willians Mendez Suarez, Cuban Anglican bishop

Arts
Antonio Tobias Mendez (born 1963), American sculptor
Cecilia Méndez (born 1986), Argentine  fashion model
Conny Méndez (1898–1979), Venezuelan composer, singer, writer, caricaturist and actress
Dalila Paola Méndez (born 1975), American artist
Denny Méndez (born 1978), Dominican model and actress
DJ Méndez (born 1975), Chilean-Swedish producer, singer and DJ
Erica Mendez, United States anime dubbing actor
Felix Mendez, United States film/television producer and director
Francisco Méndez (1907–1962), Guatemalan poet and short-story writer
Gaspar Méndez (fl.1546), Spanish architect of Badajoz
Lester Mendez, United States record producer and songwriter
Lucía Méndez (born 1951), Mexican actress and singer
Luis Fernando Castillo Mendez, Brazilian Catholic priest and patriarch
Marco Méndez (born 1976), Mexican actor
Martin Mendez (born 1978), Uruguayan musician
Nora Méndez (born 1969), Salvadoran poet
Rafael Méndez (1906–1981), United States musician
Rebeca Mendez, United States artist and designer
Ryan Mendez (guitarist), United States musician
Tomás Méndez, Mexican composer and singer

Politics and military
Aparicio Méndez (1904–1988), Uruguayan politician
Casto Méndez Núñez (1824–1869), a Spanish military naval officer
Gaspar Méndez de Haro, 7th Marquis of Carpio (1629–1687), Spanish politician and art collector
Íñigo Méndez de Vigo (born 1956), Spanish politician
Juan N. Méndez (1820–1894), Mexican general and Liberal politician
Louis Gonzaga Mendez Jr. (1915–2001), United States Army officer
Manuel A. Garcia Mendez, Puerto Rican businessman, lawyer and politician
Gonzalo Méndez de Cancio (c. 1554 – March 31, 1622), Governor of Spanish Florida (1596–1603)
Marco Aurelio Robles Méndez (1905–1990), Panamanian politician and President
Miguel Abadía Méndez (1867–1947), Colombian politician
Nicanor Costa Méndez, Argentine politician
Olga A. Méndez (1925–2009), Puerto Rican politician
Rafael de Nogales Méndez (1879–1936) known as Rafael Inchauspe Méndez, Venezuelan military mercenary
Rosie Méndez, United States politician
Santiago Méndez (1790–1870), Mexican politician
Sylvia Mendez (born 1936), American civil rights activist
Teodoro A. Dehesa Méndez (1848–1936), Mexican politician

Sports
Alexis Méndez (born 1969), Venezuelan track and road cyclist
April Jeanette Mendez (born 1987), American professional wrestler better known by the ring name AJ Lee
Bruno Méndez (born 1999), Uruguayan footballer
Carlos Méndez (baseball) (born 1974), Venezuelan baseball player
Donaldo Méndez (born 1978), United States baseball player
Edison Méndez (born 1979), Ecuadorian footballer
Federico Méndez (born 1972), Argentine rugby union player
Gabriel Mendez (born 1973), Australian footballer
Gustavo Méndez (born 1971), Uruguayan footballer
Gustavo Méndez (referee) (born 1967), Uruguayan football referee
Haley Mendez (born 1993), American squash player
Héctor Méndez (boxer)  (1897–1977), Argentine welterweight professional boxer
Héctor Méndez (rugby union), Argentine former rugby union footballer and coach
José Méndez (1887–1928), United States baseball player and manager
Juan Mendez (born 1981), United States basketball player
Judith Méndez (born 1981), Dominican Republic heptathlete
Limberg Méndez (born 1973), Bolivian football (soccer) player 
Mario Méndez (Mexican footballer) (born 1979)
Mario Méndez (Panamanian footballer) (born 1977)
Norberto Doroteo Méndez (1923–1998), Argentine footballer
Rómulo Méndez (1938–2022), Guatemalan football referee
Ronald Méndez (born 1982), Venezuelan volleyball player
Ryan Mendez (basketball), United States basketball player
Sebas Méndez (born 1997), Ecuadorian professional footballer
Sebastián Méndez (born 1977), Argentine footballer

See also
Benveniste/Mendes family were prominent in 11th to 15th century France, Portugal and Spain.

Spanish-language surnames
Patronymic surnames